Bpx may refer to:

 Qamdo Bamda Airport, China (by IATA code)
 Palya Bareli language (by ISO 639 code)